The 1988 Spanish Grand Prix was a Formula One motor race held on 2 October 1988 at the Circuito Permanente de Jerez, Jerez de la Frontera. It was the fourteenth race of the 1988 Formula One World Championship.

The 72-lap race was won by Frenchman Alain Prost, driving a McLaren-Honda, after he started from second position. British driver Nigel Mansell finished second in a Williams-Judd, with Italian Alessandro Nannini third in a Benetton-Ford. Prost's teammate and Drivers' Championship rival, Brazilian Ayrton Senna, finished fourth having started from pole position.

Pre-race
At the time of the announcement Herbert was still in hospital recovering from his horrifying F3000 crash at Brands Hatch just a few weeks earlier. With Alessandro Nannini remaining with the team, the Italian would become the team's #1 driver for 1989.

Qualifying
During qualifying, Riccardo Patrese was on his hot lap when the slower Julian Bailey got on the wrong side of the track and Patrese had to slow down considerably to avoid hitting Bailey. A furious Patrese retaliated by getting in front of Bailey and brake testing his Tyrrell, the subsequent collision sending Bailey's car into the air and off the track into the gravel trap. Officials at first blamed Bailey and also called his Tyrrell teammate Jonathan Palmer to the hearing for good measure on the premise that the slower Tyrrells were generally a menace and both drivers needed to be told. After a protest by Ken Tyrrell however, officials later reviewed the incident again and Patrese was fined $10,000 for his actions, although most in the Formula One paddock argued that Patrese's fine was not enough, and that he should also pay the Tyrrell team to fix the damages on Bailey's car. One unnamed driver was quoted as saying "I hope they fine him his bloody retainer. There are enough accidental shunts in this business without people actually trying to cause them....."

McLaren locked out the front row for the 10th time in 14 races in 1988 with Ayrton Senna putting his Honda powered McLaren MP4/4 on pole for the 11th time in 14 races. On this tight and twisty track it was no surprise to see 1987 race winner Nigel Mansell in third place in his Williams-Judd only 2/10ths from the pole. In fact, the nature of the circuit saw atmo cars line up from 3rd to 7th on the grid. The next best turbo behind the McLarens being the Ferrari of Gerhard Berger in 8th place, though the Austrian was only 1.399 slower than Senna with Nelson Piquet (Lotus-Honda) and Michele Alboreto qualifying in 10th and 11th places.

The Arrows cars struggled with Derek Warwick qualifying 17th and Eddie Cheever just scrambling onto the back row of the grid in 25th. The Arrows were in fact slower than Nicola Larini's Osella which qualified 14th.

The two Zakspeeds of Piercarlo Ghinzani and Bernd Schneider failed to qualify, as did Bailey and Oscar Larrauri in the EuroBrun. Gabriele Tarquini failed to pre-qualify his Coloni.

Race summary
From the 10th all-McLaren front row of the year, Alain Prost made a good start, with the Williams of Nigel Mansell drafting past Ayrton Senna into 2nd. Ivan Capelli and Thierry Boutsen tangled, damaging the Benetton's nosecone. On lap 2, Senna passed Mansell but ran wide, allowing the Englishman to retake the lead. On lap 16, Michele Alboreto retired with engine problems on his Ferrari. For the first 28 laps there was no change amongst the top seven: Prost led Mansell by half a second, while Senna had to defend third place from Riccardo Patrese and Capelli, who in turn was being challenged by Alessandro Nannini and Gerhard Berger.

Around lap 30, Nannini, Berger and Piquet all pitted for new tyres. After trailing the Williams for the first hour of the race, and doing so without a clutch since the early laps, Capelli managed to pass Patrese for fourth on lap 36 and then Senna for third on lap 39. However, his engine failed on lap 46.

Mansell managed to keep Prost within arms length, but with a less powerful engine on the tight Jerez circuit, could not get past, or close enough, to the Frenchman. On lap 47 Mansell pitted but a sticking wheel nut delayed him and enabled Prost to pull ahead. Meanwhile, Nannini was going fast on his new tyres, passing both Patrese and Senna in one lap. Mansell's slow stop allowed Prost to pit on lap 50 without losing his lead (though he accidentally selected second gear and was slow getting away from his pit), and a lap later Senna also pitted for new tyres and dropped out of the points. He passed Gugelmin and Berger before finally overtaking Patrese on lap 65, who drove the entire race on one set of tyres.

Prost sealed his 34th career victory with a fastest lap record and Mansell gaining his second second-place of the year from just two finishes. Nannini collected another podium finish with Senna, Patrese and Berger completing the top six.

Classification

Pre-qualifying

Qualifying

Race

Championship standings after the race
Bold text indicates World Champions.

Drivers' Championship standings

Constructors' Championship standings

References

Spanish Grand Prix
Spanish Grand Prix
Grand Prix